Seeing the Big Picture: Business Acumen to Build Your Credibility, Career, and Company is a self-help book published in March 2012 by Greenleaf Book Group. Written by the founder of Acumen Learning, Kevin R. Cope, it is a covers the topic of business acumen. The author opines that a deep understanding of a company can make its employees' work more fulfilling and purpose-driven by highlighting how they influence the success of their team, department, or organization.

Cope presents what are described as five business drivers:  cash, profit, assets, growth, and people. He argues that these are the building blocks of any business and contribute to its overall success.

On March 25, Seeing the Big Picture reached number 4 on the New York Times Best Seller List. It has been described as "an MBA in under 180 pages."

References

External links 

2012 non-fiction books
Self-help books